Appropriations Committee may refer to:

United States federal government:
 United States House Committee on Appropriations
 United States Senate Committee on Appropriations

United States state governments:

See also
 Appropriation bill